Hong Kong competed at the 1992 Summer Olympics in Barcelona, Spain. 38 competitors, 28 men and 10 women, took part in 39 events in 11 sports.

Competitors
The following is the list of number of competitors in the Games.

Archery

In its third Olympic archery competition, Hong Kong was represented by only one archer.  He did not advance to the elimination rounds.

Men's Individual Competition:
 Fung Yick 
 Ranking Round — 69th place (0-0)

Athletics

Men's 100m metres
Wai-Ming Ku
 Heat — 10.74 (→ did not advance)

Men's 200m metres
Pat Kwok Wai
 Heat — 22.45 (→ did not advance)

Badminton

Canoeing

Fencing

Three male fencers represented Hong Kong in 1992.

Men's foil
 Lo Moon Tong
 Wu Xing Yao
 Tang Kwong Hau

Judo

Men's Judo-60 kg
Lee Kan

Rowing

Sailing

Men's Sailboard (Lechner A-390)
Wong Tak Sum
 Final Ranking — 227.7 points (→ 20th place)

Women's Sailboard (Lechner A-390)
Lee Lai Shan
 Final Ranking — 143.0 points (→ 11th place)

Shooting

Swimming

Men's 50m Freestyle
 Michael Wright
 Heat – 23.90 (→ did not advance, 39th place)
 Tat Cheung Wu
 Heat – 25.45 (→ did not advance, 59th place)

Men's 100m Freestyle
 Michael Wright
 Heat – 51.88 (→ did not advance, 39th place)
 Arthur Kai Yien Li
 Heat – 52.22 (→ did not advance, 42nd place)

Men's 200m Freestyle
 Arthur Kai Yien Li
 Heat – 1:54.35 (→ did not advance, 33rd place)
 Kar Wai Kelvin Li
 Heat – 1:59.40 (→ did not advance, 41st place)

Men's 100m Breaststroke
 Andrew Rutherford
 Heat – 1:04.23 (→ did not advance, 29th place)
 Jia Han Chi
 Heat – 1:06.81 (→ did not advance, 44th place)

Men's 200m Breaststroke
 Andrew Rutherford
 Heat – 2:24.29 (→ did not advance, 37th place)
 Jia Han Chi
 Heat – 2:30.74 (→ did not advance, 44th place)

Men's 100m Butterfly
 Arthur Kai Yien Li
 Heat – 56.47 (→ did not advance, 39th place)
 Duncan Todd
 Heat – 57.29 (→ did not advance, 48th place)

Men's 200m Butterfly
 Duncan Todd
 Heat – 2:08.20 (→ did not advance, 38th place)

Men's 200m Individual Medley
 Arthur Kai Yien Li
 Heat – 2:09.32 (→ did not advance, 37th place)
 Duncan Todd
 Heat – 2:12.29 (→ did not advance, 42nd place)

Men's 400m Individual Medley
 Duncan Todd
 Heat – 4:41.84 (→ did not advance, 30th place)

Men's 4 × 100 m Freestyle Relay
 Arthur Kai Yien Li, Tat Cheung Wu, Kar Wai Kelvin Li, and Michael Wright
 Heat – 3:30.61 (→ did not advance, 14th place)

Men's 4 × 200 m Freestyle Relay
 Arthur Kai Yien Li, Michael Wright, Kar Wai Kelvin Li, and Tat Cheung Wu
 Heat – 7:54.30 (→ did not advance, 16th place)

Men's 4 × 100 m Medley Relay
 Arthur Kai Yien Li, Andrew Rutherford, Duncan Todd, and Michael Wright
 Heat – 3:56.46 (→ did not advance, 19th place)

Women's 50m Freestyle
 Robyn Lamsam
 Heat – 27.40 (→ did not advance, 36th place)

Women's 100m Freestyle
 Robyn Lamsam
 Heat – 59.26 (→ did not advance, 37th place)

Women's 200m Freestyle
 Robyn Lamsam
 Heat – 2:08.60 (→ did not advance, 30th place)

Women's 400m Freestyle
 Robyn Lamsam
 Heat – 4:32.23 (→ did not advance, 30th place)

Table tennis

References

External links
Official Olympic Reports

Nations at the 1992 Summer Olympics
1992
1992 in Hong Kong sport